Papyrus Oxyrhynchus 21 (P. Oxy. 21) is a fragment of the second book of the Iliad (Β, 745-764), written in Greek. It was discovered by Grenfell and Hunt in 1897 in Oxyrhynchus. The fragment is dated to the first or second century. It is housed in the University of Chicago Oriental Institute. The text was published by Grenfell and Hunt in 1898.

The manuscript was written on papyrus in the form of a roll. The measurements of the fragment are 200 by 147 mm. The fragment contains 20 lines of text. The text is written in a large round upright uncial hand. There are rough breathings and accents.

See also 
 Oxyrhynchus Papyri
 Papyrus Oxyrhynchus 20
 Papyrus Oxyrhynchus 22

References 

021
1st-century manuscripts
2nd-century manuscripts
1897 archaeological discoveries
Manuscripts of the Iliad